Ratko Dostanić (born 25 October 1959) is a Serbian former professional footballer who played as a defender and current manager of Zeta.

Playing career
After coming through the youth system of Partizan, Dostanić went on to play for Timok and Rad in the Yugoslav Second League, before moving abroad to France in 1986. He played for Bourges (1986–87), Caen (1987–88), Le Mans (1988–90), Rodez (1990–92), Red Star (1992–94), Châtellerault (1994–95) and Montluçon (1995–96).

Managerial career
After serving as an assistant to Slavoljub Muslin at Red Star Belgrade, Dostanić was appointed as manager of fellow First League of FR Yugoslavia contender Obilić in November 2000. He eventually left the position in March 2002. In December 2002, Dostanić returned to Obilić. He left the club for the second time in May 2003. The next month, Dostanić agreed terms with Sartid Smederevo. He took over as manager of Bulgarian club Slavia Sofia in December 2003.

In late December 2006, Dostanić was appointed as manager of OFK Beograd. He announced his resignation on 1 April 2007 due to poor results. Less than a week later, Dostanić took charge of fellow Serbian SuperLiga side Bežanija until the end of the season. He rejoined the club in late August 2007. In late 2007, Dostanić served as manager of Greek club Veria. He subsequently moved to Asia and took charge of Chinese club Dalian Shide in early 2008.

In June 2008, Dostanić signed as manager of Macedonian side Vardar. He decided to leave the club after Macedonia recognized the independence of Kosovo in October 2008. Shortly after leaving Macedonia, Dostanić was appointed as manager of Serbian First League club Srem in late October 2008. He stepped down from his position six months later.

On 23 July 2009, Dostanić was named new manager of Bulgarian champions Levski Sofia, replacing Emil Velev and signing a two-year contract. He remained in charge for less than three months. On 21 March 2010, Red Star Belgrade announced the appointment of Dostanić as manager. He replaced Vladimir Petrović despite the team's leading position in the league after 19 rounds. With Dostanić at the helm, Red Star Belgrade failed to win the title after three years, finishing as runners-up to arch-rivals Partizan. However, the team won the Serbian Cup, defeating Vojvodina in the final.

In February 2017, Dostanić returned to Veria for the remainder of the season to help the club avoid relegation.

Honours
Levski Sofia
 Bulgarian Supercup: 2009
Red Star Belgrade
 Serbian Cup: 2009–10

References

External links

1959 births
Living people
People from Lučani
Association football defenders
Yugoslav footballers
Serbia and Montenegro footballers
FK Timok players
FK Rad players
Bourges 18 players
Stade Malherbe Caen players
Le Mans FC players
Rodez AF players
Red Star F.C. players
SO Châtellerault players
Montluçon Football players
Yugoslav expatriate footballers
Expatriate footballers in France
Yugoslav expatriates in France
Serbia and Montenegro expatriate footballers
Serbia and Montenegro expatriate sportspeople in France
Serbia and Montenegro football managers
Serbian football managers
Red Star Belgrade non-playing staff
FK Obilić managers
FK Smederevo managers
PFC Slavia Sofia managers
Red Star Belgrade managers
OFK Beograd managers
Veria F.C. managers
Dalian Shide F.C. managers
FK Vardar managers
PFC Levski Sofia managers
Diagoras F.C. managers
Club Athlétique Bizertin managers
Athlitiki Enosi Larissa F.C. managers
Levadiakos F.C. managers
Trikala F.C. managers
Niki Volos F.C. managers
FK Zemun managers
FK Rabotnički managers
FK Zeta managers
Serbian SuperLiga managers
Super League Greece managers
Chinese Super League managers
Serbian expatriate football managers
Expatriate football managers in Bulgaria
Serbia and Montenegro expatriate sportspeople in Bulgaria
Serbian expatriate sportspeople in Bulgaria
Expatriate football managers in Greece
Serbian expatriate sportspeople in Greece
Expatriate football managers in China
Serbian expatriate sportspeople in China
Expatriate football managers in Montenegro
Serbian expatriate sportspeople in Montenegro
Expatriate football managers in North Macedonia
Serbian expatriate sportspeople in North Macedonia
Expatriate football managers in Georgia (country)
Serbian expatriate sportspeople in Georgia (country)
Expatriate football managers in Tunisia
Serbian expatriate sportspeople in Tunisia